2148 Epeios  is a mid-sized Jupiter trojan from the Greek camp, approximately  in diameter. It was discovered on 24 October 1976, by Danish astronomer Richard Martin West at ESO's La Silla Observatory in northern Chile. The dark Jovian asteroid is the principal body of the proposed Epeios family and was named after Epeius from Greek mythology.

Orbit and classification 

Epeios is a Jupiter trojan in a 1:1 orbital resonance with Jupiter. It is located in the leading Greek camp at the Gas Giant's  Lagrangian point, 60° ahead on its orbit . It orbits the Sun at a distance of 4.9–5.5 AU once every 11 years and 11 months (4,350 days; semi-major axis of 5.22 AU). Its orbit has an eccentricity of 0.06 and an inclination of 9° with respect to the ecliptic. The body's observation arc begins with its official discovery observation at La Silla in October 1976.

Epeios family 

Fernando Roig and Ricardo Gil-Hutton identified Epeios as the principal body of a small Jovian asteroid family, using the hierarchical clustering method (HCM), which looks for groupings of neighboring asteroids based on the smallest distances between them in the proper orbital element space. According to the astronomers, the Epeios family belongs to the larger Menelaus clan, an aggregation of Jupiter trojans which is composed of several families, similar to the Flora family in the inner asteroid belt.

However this family is not included in David Nesvorný HCM-analysis from 2014. Instead, Epeios is listed as a non-family asteroid of the Jovian background population on the Asteroids Dynamic Site (AstDyS) which based on another analysis by Milani and Knežević.

Naming 

This minor planet was named from Greek mythology after the Greek warrior Epeius, leader of the contingent from Phocis during the Trojan War. Epeius also built the wooden Trojan Horse. He then chose the other 29 soldiers who would accompany him inside. The official  was published by the Minor Planet Center on 1 July 1979.

Physical characteristics

Rotation period 

As of 2018, no rotational lightcurve of Epeios has been obtained from photometric observations. The body's rotation period, pole and shape remain unknown.

Diameter and albedo 

According to the survey carried out by the NEOWISE mission of NASA's Wide-field Infrared Survey Explorer, Epeios measures 37.98 kilometers in diameter and its surface has an albedo of 0.064.

References

External links 
 Dictionary of Minor Planet Names, Google books
 Discovery Circumstances: Numbered Minor Planets (1)-(5000) – Minor Planet Center
 Asteroid 2148 Epeios at the Small Bodies Data Ferret
 
 

002148
Discoveries by Richard Martin West
Named minor planets
19761024